Asrar-ul-Haq Mian (Urdu: اسرار الحق میاں) was a Pakistani lawyer and Senior Advocate of the Supreme Court of Pakistan. He was the 15th President of the Supreme Court Bar Association of Pakistan. He previously served as three-time member of the Pakistan Bar Council and remained its Chairman Executive.   
He also served twice as the president of Lahore high court Bar Association.

For the first time in the history of the bar association, he organized the Lifetime Achievements Award, which was given to Ijaz Husain Batalvi and Khawaja Sultan Ahmad attended by hundreds of lawyers including Akhtar Aly Kureshy, Sher Afghan Asadi and Shahzad Nasir. Mian also established a clinic/mini hospital for lawyers. He also constructed an indoor sports complex for young lawyers.

President Supreme Court Bar Association
He was elected President of Supreme Court Bar Association of Pakistan 2012-13 from Asma Jahangir Independent group. He was 15th President and worked for betterment of the lawyers and up gradation of the Bar and Bench.

President Lahore High Court Bar Association
He was elected twice President of Lahore High Court Bar Association 2006-07 and 2001-02. As a President, he started various welfare projects for lawyers including Lawyer's Clinic and laboratory, Sports, and Life Time Achievement award for the lawyers who did excel in the profession.

Member Pakistan Bar Council
He was elected thrice as a Member Pakistan Bar Council 2011-15, 2006–10, 1995-00 and played his role to elevate the legal profession in Pakistan.

See also
 Supreme Court Bar Association of Pakistan
 Punjab Bar Council
 Lahore High Court Bar Association
 Pakistan Bar Council

References

2020 deaths
Pakistani democracy activists
Lawyers from Lahore
Year of birth missing
Presidents of the Supreme Court Bar Association of Pakistan
Chairmen of the Pakistan Bar Council
People from Lahore